Java House (formerly Nairobi Java House) is a chain of coffee houses with its head office at ABC Place in Nairobi, Kenya, founded in 1999 by Kevin Ashley and Jon Wagner. It is one of the few places where one can find "export-quality" Kenyan coffee brewed and served in the region.

Starting from the first cafe at Adam's Arcade along Ngong Road which opened in 1999, Java House has grown to 68 locations across East Africa as of November 2018. The Java brand is also the owner of Italian pizza chain 360 Degrees Pizza and the first ever East African self-service frozen yoghurt store, Planet Yogurt.

Corporate governance

Past Chief Executive Officers 
Kevin Ashley (2010–2016)

 Co-founded Nairobi Java House in 1999.
 Oversaw the growth of the company from a single brand, Nairobi Java House, in Kenya to multiple brands in Kenya and Uganda.
 Completed the sale of Java House to Emerging Capital Partners in 2012.

Ken Kuguru (2016–2018)

 Grew Java House to 60+ stores across 10 cities in Kenya, Uganda and Rwanda.
 In 2017, led the company to one of the most successful private equity F&B deals in East Africa to date.

Paul Smith (2018 - Present)

 Paul's principle role is the development and implementation of the Group's growth and development strategies.

References

External links

 Java House official website
Java House Group corporate website 

Restaurants in Nairobi
Coffeehouses and cafés